U.S. Highway 151 (US 151) is a United States Numbered Highway that runs through the states of Iowa and Wisconsin. The southern terminus for US 151 is at a junction with Interstate 80 (I-80) in Iowa County, Iowa, and its northern terminus is at Manitowoc, Wisconsin. The route, from south to north follows a northeasterly path through the two states.

US 151 is an important corridor- connecting Cedar Rapids, Iowa to Fond du Lac, Wisconsin with an expressway (except for a segment about ten miles where it uses arterial roads instead in Madison, Wisconsin).

The two highways share a route from there to Dickeyville, Wisconsin.  south of Dubuque, US 61/US 151 joins with US 52 and shares a route with US 52 until it veers south in Key West.

At Dickeyville, US 151 splits off and heads northeast to Platteville. US 61/WIS 35 continues north. US 151 later joins with US 18 near Dodgeville. The two highways share a route all the way to Madison.

Route description

Iowa

US 151 begins at exit 225 along I-80 in rural Iowa County north of Williamsburg. The highway heads to the north and intersects US 6 outside of Homestead, Iowa. US 151 turns east onto US 6 and the two routes run concurrently for about  until US 6 splits to the east at Homestead. US 151 continues to the north and crosses the Iowa River on its way to Amana, the main village of the Amana Colonies and the eastern end of Iowa Highway 220 (Iowa 220). The road clips the southeastern corner of Benton County, Iowa at Walford and it turns to the northeast toward Fairfax. When it reaches the US 30 / US 218 freeway in Cedar Rapids, US 151 turns east onto the highway while US 151 Business continues northeast on Williams Boulevard SW. The freeway is dotted with interchanges providing access to southern Cedar Rapids, most importantly Edgewood Road SW, I-380, and C Street SW. Just east of the Cedar River, US 151 exits from US 30, which continues east toward Clinton.

The route splits from the other roads and continues toward Dubuque as an expressway. This  stretch crosses many major rivers including both the Wapsipinicon and the Maquoketa. The road eventually goes into the Driftless Area where it meets up with US 61 around the Dubuque Regional Airport. US 52 briefly joins the two routes, concurrently, for two miles south of Dubuque. The combined road then heads into the state of Wisconsin.

Dubuque to Madison
US 61/US 151 crosses the Mississippi River into Wisconsin via the Dubuque-Wisconsin Bridge from Dubuque, Iowa and passes through a cut in the river ridge before turning northward to the western terminus of WIS 11 after  of due east travel. WIS 35 and the Great River Road join the route at that interchange, heading north. The highway at this point is limited access highway with two lanes in each direction. The northward trek of the route passes through mixed residential and farmland as it crosses Badger Road and merges with Eagle Point Road. Eagle Point road merges with US 151 from the left side of the road. The limited access portion ends at this interchange. Another pair of half diamond interchanges connect the highway with County Trunk Highway HHH (CTH-HHH) and CTH-H as it bypasses Kieler to the northwest. At Dickeyville, US 61, WIS 35 and the Great River Road route exit north off of US 151 into town. US 151 passes Dickeyville to the east and descends into a valley cut northeast of the village, paralleling the Little Platte River and Blockhouse Creek within the valley for a  stretch before climbing back onto the ridge top on the other side of the valley. US 151 then approaches Platteville and enters a section of limited access at CTH-D (US 151 Business). The limited access stretch ends after three interchanges  to the east. The last of the interchanges is WIS 126/CTH-G with access to Belmont. The route turns northeastward from this point, crosses the Cottage Inn Branch and begins the first of several descents into valleys, two of which are prior to passing Mineral Point and another two while passing the city.

The highway is limited access between the two interchanges that provide access to Mineral Point: CTH-O and WIS 23. WIS 23 joins US 151 heading northbound at that point until the first interchange at Dodgeville. This interchange begins another short stretch of freeway to the point where US 18 joins the route. US 18/US 151 heads eastbound past that interchange.

The section of expressway past Dodgeville passes through rolling hills populated with farmland mixed with small woodlands. The highway passes Ridgeway and Barneveld. Access to Ridgeway is by an interchange and a surface intersection with a short business route on CTH-HHH. The interchange was previously an intersection; however, it was announced in 2011 that the first intersection would be closed, and an exit would be constructed, due to the numerous fatal accidents that happen at the intersection each year. The new interchange on the western end of town opened in late 2018. Access to Barneveld is at an interchange with CTH-ID and an at-grade intersection with CTH-K. CTH-ID parallels US 18/US 151 for the entire stretch between Barneveld and Mount Horeb. A section of freeway begins at WIS 78 and ends at the other end of CTH-ID as the highway bypasses Mount Horeb just to the south of the city's passing residential subdivisions. A mix of grade separation and level intersections cross the winding highway as it continues eastward until the interchange with CTH-MV (Verona Avenue) begins a section of freeway that bypasses Verona to the south. This section provides access to four interchanges including the two endpoints of CTH-MV. The freeway continues into Fitchburg and provides access to two interchanges at CTH-PD (McKee Road) and Williamsburg Way. The freeway then ends. The road continues as an urban multilane highway known as Verona Road as it enters Madison. Verona Road passes through a residential and commercial area on the Southwest Side of Madison. US 18 and US 151 merge east on the West Beltline Highway—joining US 12 and US 14.

Madison metropolitan area
At this interchange, US 14 turns south off the beltline towards Oregon, and US 151 turns north and into central Madison; US 151 passes Monona Bay to the west along South Park Street. US 151 turns northeast onto West Washington Avenue for about  then follows Proudfit Street and North Shore Drive—paralleling the Monona Bay shore—and turns north onto John Nolen Drive. The street passes under the Monona Terrace Convention Center as it passes to the south and east of downtown Madison. US 151 turns northwest onto South Blair Street for three city blocks to East Washington Avenue—where it turns northeast and follows East Washington Avenue, bisecting the Madison Isthmus, and leading out of the city to the east.

Madison to Fond du Lac

At a cloverleaf interchange with I-39/I-90/I-94, a section of freeway begins and continues along US 151 northeast through commercial zones into residential areas. A highway bypass was constructed north and west of Sun Prairie, but so much commercial and residential development subsequently happened to the north and west of the bypass that the route essentially divides Sun Prairie in half. The route now has four interchanges with highways and streets in Sun Prairie.  After Sun Prairie, US 151 passes through farmland, heading toward Columbus. The highway bypasses the city via a partial beltline to the north and east, completely clearing the city. WIS 16 and WIS 60 crosses under US 151 about midway along the Columbus bypass. US 151 becomes an expressway with level intersections after the interchange with WIS 73 at the end of the bypass portion. The route becomes a freeway at Beaver Dam, bypassing the city to the southeast. The route follows the edge of residential zones of the city before passing an industrial area at the northeastern end of the bypass. Within this freeway section exists a level railroad crossing near CTH-E (East Burnett Street). US 151 crosses at-grade intersections after the interchange with CTH-A northeast of Beaver Dam and encounters one more freeway section at Waupun, bypassing the city to the east. The Waupun bypass also includes a level railroad crossing halfway between the CTH-M and WIS 26 interchanges. The four-lane expressway of US 151 continues east, bypassing Fond du Lac to the south and east. This expressway provides a mixture of at-grade intersections and grade-separated interchanges at I-41/US& 41 and WIS 23. WisDOT currently is studying upgrades to two sections of US 151. The first study would preserve the Fond du Lac Bypass from I-41 to WIS 23, with the ultimate goal being freeway conversion. The second study is examining freeway upgrades to the route from WIS 73 in Columbus to WIS 49 in Waupun.

Fond du Lac to Manitowoc

The multi-lane section of US 151 ends after turning north away from Fond du Lac and the route follows the east shore of Lake Winnebago for about half the length of the shoreline. US 151 then turns east at the intersection with WIS 55 and follows two-lane surface roads and briefly running concurrently with WIS 32 and WIS 57 in Chilton. The roadway passes through farmland throughout this section until it picks up WIS 42 just outside of Manitowoc and ends at I-43 while WIS 42 continues east into Manitowoc.

History

US 151 was one of the original U.S. Highways from 1926. At the time, it only ran from Fond du Lac, Wisconsin, to Madison, where it terminated at Western Avenue and Main Street. In 1934, the highway was extended southwest to Cedar Rapids, Iowa, incorporating the full length of former U.S. Highway 118 (Dodgeville to Dickeyville) and part of former U.S. Highway 161 (Dubuque to Cedar Rapids; US 161 from Cedar Rapids south to Keokuk became US 218). At the time, the southern end of the route was at Williams Blvd SW and 16th Ave SW, what was then US 30 and US 218. In the 1940s, the highway was extended northeast to Manitowoc.

Illinois

In 1969, the Eagle Point Bridge, which connected US 151 and US 61 with Wisconsin, was closed, and those highways were rerouted over the Julien Dubuque Bridge with US 20 from Dubuque to East Dubuque, Illinois. The route then followed Illinois Route 35 and WIS 35 north to what is now the current highway. In 1982, the Dubuque-Wisconsin Bridge opened, the old Eagle Point Bridge was demolished, and US 151 and US 61 were rerouted onto the new bridge. This is the only instance of US 61 and US 151 entering Illinois.

Routings
In 1981, the southern terminus of the highway was extended once again when the US 30 bypass was built. The southern terminus was at the US 151 and 30 interchange. By 1986, the main US 151 was rerouted onto state highway 13 and US 30 to bypass Cedar Rapids. The previous route through Cedar Rapids was renamed US 151 Business (though the official state designation for it is Iowa 922). Finally, in 1989, US 151 was extended to its current southern end at exit 225 along I-80. This extension followed the old route of Iowa 149. As a result, US 151 became the main route through the Amana Colonies.

US 151's northern terminus was changed in 2022 to end at I-43 instead of in downtown Manitowoc where WIS 42 traveled through before being rerouted onto I-43 in 1980.

Exit list

Related routes

U.S. Route 51

See also

References

External links

 Endpoints of U.S. Highway 151

51-1
51-1
51-1
1
Transportation in Iowa County, Iowa
Transportation in Benton County, Iowa
Transportation in Linn County, Iowa
Transportation in Jones County, Iowa
Transportation in Dubuque County, Iowa
Transportation in Grant County, Wisconsin
Transportation in Lafayette County, Wisconsin
Transportation in Iowa County, Wisconsin
Transportation in Dane County, Wisconsin
Transportation in Columbia County, Wisconsin
Transportation in Dodge County, Wisconsin
Transportation in Fond du Lac County, Wisconsin
Transportation in Calumet County, Wisconsin
Transportation in Manitowoc County, Wisconsin
1926 establishments in the United States
51-1